Psidopala is a genus of moths belonging to the subfamily Thyatirinae of the Drepanidae.

Species
 Psidopala apicalis (Leech, 1900)
 Psidopala kishidai Yoshimoto, 1987
 Psidopala opalescens (Alphéraky, 1897)
 Psidopala ornata (Leech, 1900)
 Psidopala paeoniola Laszlo, G. Ronkay, L. Ronkay & Witt, 2007
 Psidopala pennata (Wileman, 1914)
 Psidopala roseola Werny, 1966
 Psidopala shirakii (Matsumura, 1931)
 Psidopala tenuis (Hampson, 1896)
 Psidopala undulans (Hampson, 1893)
 Psidopala warreni Laszlo, G. Ronkay, L. Ronkay & Witt, 2007

References

 , 1921, in Oberthür Études de Lépidoptérologie Comparée 18: 93
 , 2007, Esperiana Buchreihe zur Entomologie Band 13: 1-683 

Thyatirinae
Drepanidae genera